"The Silly Song", also known as "The Dwarfs' Yodel Song", is a song from Walt Disney's 1937 animated film Snow White and the Seven Dwarfs sung by Otis Harlan, Billy Gilbert, Pinto Colvig, Roy Atwell, and Scotty Mattraw. This features an instrument septet. The Seven Dwarfs yodel in this song. The melody is taken from the Irish folk song "Peggy Lettermore".

Sleepy: clarinet-like wind instrument, similar to a tarogato or soprano saxophone in sound, shaped like a fish
Grumpy: finely carved organ
Dopey: drum kit
Sneezy: lute
Bashful: concertina
Doc: double bass-like instrument called a swanette; also Sneezy's lute.
Happy: yodeler; also Doc's swannette and Dopey's drum kit at the end.

Synopsis of the number
After discovering Snow White in their house and having dinner, the dwarfs throw a party for Snow White. In the song, Happy and Bashful each sing about something silly, both of which are followed by a chorus. After which, the dwarfs all take turns dancing with Snow White. A little more than halfway through the song, Dopey climbs onto Sneezy's shoulders while wearing a long cloak so that he could seem like a tall enough dance partner for Snow White. They dance with her for a little while, and then she lets them dance on their own. Dopey's dance is abruptly ended when Sneezy lets out a really big sneeze causing Dopey to pop out, fly upward and out of the coat, and safely into the cottage's rafters.

This song includes a drum solo by Dopey, driven by his pursuit of a pesky housefly, an organ solo by Grumpy, and a lute solo by Doc. This segment is immediately followed by the "Someday My Prince Will Come" segment.

An additional verse for Sneezy is found on the 1938 Snow White Soundtrack 78 record. Verses for Doc are not used during the song in the movie.

Disney Sing-Along Edits

The song is featured on the Disney Sing-Along Songs volumes, "Heigh Ho" and "Topsy Turvy".  Since it is a fairly long number with not many lyrics to sing along to, the versions on the Sing-Alongs are edited down.  The following edits were made for such videos:

 After Bashful's verse and the following chorus, the sing-along versions immediately cut to Dopey and Sneezy coming out to the dance floor in the coat.
 Doc's lute solo is cut from both sing-along versions.
 After Sneezy sneezes Dopey out of the coat, there is a shot of Dopey showing where he landed in the rafters.  This clip was cut from the version on "Heigh Ho" but was restored for "Topsy Turvy".

References

1937 songs
Comedy songs
Songs from Snow White and the Seven Dwarfs (1937 film)
Songs with lyrics by Larry Morey
Songs with music by Frank Churchill
Seven Dwarfs